The following television stations in the United States brand as channel 14 (though neither using virtual channel 14 nor broadcasting on physical RF channel 14):
 WCBD-DT2 in Charleston, South Carolina
 WREX-DT2 in Rockford, Illinois

The following television stations  in the United States formerly branded as channel 14:
 KWWT in Odessa, Texas

14 branded